Richard "Spike" Goddard (born 17 August 1992) is an Australian racing driver.

Career

Karting
Goddard began his racing career in karting at the age of fourteen and raced in his native Australia.

Formula Ford
In 2009, he graduated to single–seaters into the Australian Formula Ford NSW Series, competing in the final three races. For the next year, Goddard also competed in Formula Ford Victoria series in Australia. He finished this championship on the third place.

Goddard decided to move in United Kingdom to contest in British Formula Ford Championship in 2011 with Jamun Racing. He had nineteen point-scoring finishes in 24 races and finally finished tenth.

Formula Three

In 2012, Goddard graduated to the Rookie Class of the British Formula 3 Championship, competing for ThreeBond with T-Sport. Fellow Australian racer Duvashen Padayachee was his only rival in this, because only Goddard and Padayachee raced the season full-time. The other four drivers competed in less than half the season. Goddard took the championship title with 49-point advantage on Padayachee.

Goddard will continue his collaboration for ThreeBond with T-Sport, competing in FIA European Formula Three Championship full-time in 2013.

Toyota Racing Series
Goddard participated in the Toyota Racing Series in early 2013 with M2 Competition.

Formula One
Goddard test drove the 2014 Force India F1 car on the second day of the post season test at Yas Marina Circuit, in Abu Dhabi. He had a "solid day's running"

Racing record

Career summary

† Guest driver, he was ineligible for points.
* Season still in progress.

Complete FIA Formula 3 European Championship results
(key)

† Guest driver, he was ineligible for points.

Complete Porsche Supercup results
(key) (Races in bold indicate pole position) (Races in italics indicate fastest lap)

References

External links

 
 

1992 births
Living people
Australian racing drivers
Formula Ford drivers
British Formula Three Championship drivers
FIA Formula 3 European Championship drivers
Toyota Racing Series drivers
Porsche Supercup drivers
T-Sport drivers
M2 Competition drivers
Porsche Carrera Cup Germany drivers
Lamborghini Super Trofeo drivers